Morohashi Dam  is a rockfill dam located in Ishikawa Prefecture in Japan. The dam is used for flood control and irrigation. The catchment area of the dam is 2.6 km2. The dam impounds about 15  ha of land when full and can store 1725 thousand cubic meters of water. The construction of the dam was started on 1977 and completed in 1986.

See also
List of dams in Japan

References

Dams in Ishikawa Prefecture